Silene andicola is a species of flowering plant in the  family Caryophyllaceae.

The species is native to Argentina, Bolivia, and Chile. Plants grow on rocky slopes, outcrops, soily screes, grasslands, and open scrubs.

References 

andicola